Udeoides is a genus of snout moths of the subfamily Spilomelinae in the family Crambidae. The genus was described by Koen Maes in 2006 and distinguished from the related genus Udea. All six species are distributed in the Afrotropical realm.

Species
Udeoides bonakandaiensis Maes, 2006
Udeoides invaginalis Maes, 2019
Udeoides muscosalis (Hampson, 1913)
Udeoides nigribasalis (Hampson, 1913)
Udeoides nolalis (C. Felder, R. Felder & Rogenhofer, 1875)
Udeoides viridis Maes, 2006

References

Spilomelinae
Crambidae genera